This is a list of seasons completed by the Orlando Magic. The Orlando Magic are an American professional basketball team based in Orlando, Florida. They play in the Southeast Division of the Eastern Conference of the National Basketball Association (NBA). The team was established in 1989. The Magic have not won an NBA title, but have appeared in the NBA Finals twice, in 1995 and 2009. The best record posted by the Magic was 60–22, in the 1995–96 season, and their worst record was 18–64, in the team's inaugural season.

Table key

Seasons

All-time records
Note: statistics are correct as of the conclusion of the 2021–22 NBA season

Notes
 Due to a lockout, the 1998–99 season did not start until February 5, 1999, and all 29 teams played a shortened regular season schedule of 50 games. The Magic finished tied with the Miami Heat and the Indiana Pacers for the best record in the Eastern Conference; based on tiebreakers, the Heat won the Atlantic Division and earned the top seed, while the Pacers won the Central Division and earned the #2 seed.
 Due to a lockout, the 2011–12 season did not start until December 25, 2011, and all 30 teams played a shortened regular season schedule of 66 games.
 Due to the COVID-19 pandemic, the 2019–20 season was suspended from March 11 to July 30, 2020, and the regular season was shortened to 73 games for the Magic.
 Due to the COVID-19 pandemic, the 2020–21 season did not start until December 22, 2020, and all 30 teams played a shortened regular season schedule of 72 games.

References

External links
Orlando Magic at Basketball Reference
Orlando Magic at Land of Basketball

 
seasons
Events in Orlando, Florida